25-hydroxycholesterol 7-alpha-hydroxylase also known as oxysterol and steroid 7-alpha-hydroxylase is an enzyme that in humans is encoded by the CYP7B1 gene. This gene encodes a member of the cytochrome P450 superfamily of enzymes. The cytochrome P450 proteins are monooxygenases which catalyze many reactions involved in drug metabolism and synthesis of cholesterol, steroids and other lipids.

Function 

This endoplasmic reticulum membrane protein catalyzes the first reaction in the cholesterol catabolic pathway of extrahepatic tissues, which converts cholesterol to bile acids. This enzyme likely plays a minor role in total bile acid synthesis, but may also be involved in the development of atherosclerosis, neurosteroid metabolism and sex hormone synthesis.

CYP7B was discovered by Stapleton in a screen for transcripts expressed differentially in rat hippocampus versus the remainder of the brain. The encoded polypeptide, initially designated hct-1 (hippocampus transcript 1), had significant homology with CYP7A1. The protein was designated CYP7B1 by the P450 Nomenclature Committee. Expression of the recombinant protein demonstrated 7alpha-hydroxylation activity for steroids (DHEA, pregnenolone) and oxysterols including 25- and 27-hydroxycholesterol, confirmed by knockout in mouse that abolished oxysterol hydroxylation in liver and brain and steroid hydroxylation in multiple tissues. Reporter tagging of the Cyp7b1 gene demonstrated that the enzyme is widely expressed, particularly strongly in brain, liver, kidney, heart, and spleen.

References

Further reading